Nothing Is Quick in the Desert is the fourteenth studio album by American hip hop group Public Enemy. The album was released on June 30, 2017, on Bandcamp.

Background 
“‘Nothing Is Quick In The Desert‘ is a saying I use when the average person looks at the record industry,” Chuck D said in a statement. “It looks dead like a desert. But there’s plenty of life in the desert when one is educated on what they see and hear. There, a cactus absorbs and stores water deep in its root, taken from the air itself and certain creatures thrive in that dry heat whereas the average cannot. It pays to be above average (or well below it) in the desert for survival. The music industry is similar in that analogy. It’s still in motion, it just needs redefinition.” 
The album features guest appearances from such artists as Ice-T, Mo Bee, Prophets of Rage, EPMD's Parrish Smith, Solé, and Sammy Vegas

Critical reception

Nothing Is Quick In The Desert received generally positive reviews from music critics. At Metacritic, which assigns a normalized rating out of 100 to reviews from mainstream critics, the album received an average score of 71 based on 6 reviews, which indicates "generally favorable reviews".

Track listing

References

2017 albums
Public Enemy (band) albums